Willy Petter was an Austrian figure skater who competed in pair skating. With partner Lilly Gaillard, he became a three-time European medalist, winning bronze in 1931 and silver in 1932 and 1933.

Competitive highlights 
With Lilly Gaillard

References 

Austrian male pair skaters
Date of birth missing
Date of death missing